Patrick Bruce Reith Symonds (born 11 June 1953) is a British motor racing engineer. He was the Chief Technical Officer at Williams Grand Prix Engineering, from 2013 until 2016 having previously worked at the Benetton, Renault and Virgin Formula One teams. He is currently the Chief Technical Officer of Formula One. In September 2009, Symonds was forced to resign from the ING Renault F1 team due to his involvement in race fixing at the 2008 Singapore Grand Prix. After the Fédération Internationale de l'Automobile (FIA) conducted its own investigation, Symonds and Renault's Managing Director Flavio Briatore were banned indefinitely from any events sanctioned by the FIA, although this ban was later overturned by a French Tribunal de Grande Instance.

Early life and education
Symonds was born in Bedford, England and educated at Gresham's School in Holt, Norfolk, after which he studied at Oxford Polytechnic and Cranfield University, where he gained a Masters in aerodynamics.

Career
After starting his career in lower motorsport categories, he joined Toleman in the early 1980s. As Toleman grew, it was taken over to become Benetton Formula, and was subsequently sold and renamed Renault F1. Symonds remained throughout this entire period with the team, working his way through the technical ranks. He served as an engineer for many of the team's drivers, including Alessandro Nannini and Teo Fabi.

After a brief move to the abortive Reynard F1 project with then-chief designer Rory Byrne in 1991, he returned to Benetton. In the mid-1990s he was Michael Schumacher's race engineer while also assuming the role of Head of Research and Development. Symonds remained with Benetton when Schumacher departed to Ferrari in 1996. When Ross Brawn was also lured to Ferrari, Symonds became Benetton's Technical Director. When Mike Gascoyne joined the team in 2001, Symonds was promoted to executive director of Engineering, a post which he retained though the transition to Renault ownership in 2002.

Singapore crash

In July 2009, Nelson Piquet Jr. claimed Symonds asked him to deliberately crash at the 2008 Singapore Grand Prix to manufacture a situation which would assist team-mate Fernando Alonso to win the race.

The ING Renault F1 Team released a statement on 16 September 2009 stating that Symonds was no longer part of the team. Symonds was subsequently suspended from F1 events for five years after expressing his "eternal regret and shame" to the FIA World Motor Sport Council. However, his ban was overturned by the French Tribunal de Grande Instance on 5 January 2010, and he was also paid €5,000 in compensation. In April, he and Briatore reached an out-of-court settlement with the FIA where he could return to F1 in 2013 but could be a consultant to a current Formula 1 team in the meantime.

2009–2013
In , Symonds returned to F1 as a consultant for the Virgin Racing (later Manor F1) team to conduct a thorough overview of its operation, following a disappointing start to its second season in the sport. Shortly afterwards, the team parted company with existing technical director Nick Wirth. Symonds is believed by many to have effectively taken Wirth's place, although he was still only a consultant due to the terms of his ban.

Symonds had a column in the F1 Racing magazine, and serves on the committee for the MSc in Motorsport Engineering and Management at Cranfield University.

Williams F1
In July 2013 it was announced that Symonds had been appointed as Chief Technical Officer for the Williams F1 Team, replacing Mike Coughlan.

Williams confirmed in December 2016 that Symonds would be leaving upon the expiration of his contract at the end of the year.

Sky Sports F1
In March 2017 it was announced that Symonds was to join the Sky F1 team.

Formula 1 Chief Technical Officer 
Since March 2017 Symonds has served as Formula 1's Chief Technical Officer.

References

1953 births
Living people
People educated at Gresham's School
Alumni of Cranfield University
Renault people
Formula One engineers
Benetton Formula
Williams Grand Prix Engineering